Vita or VITA (plural vitae) is Latin for "life", and may refer to:

 Vita, the usual start to the title of a biography in Latin, by which (in a known context) the work is often referred to; frequently of a saint, then called hagiography
 Vita (brand), a beverage in Hong Kong
 A curriculum vitae, a written overview of a person's experience and other qualifications for a job
 Opel Vita, a car made by Opel
 PlayStation Vita, a handheld game console by Sony
 VITA, acronym for Views, Inventory, Transformation and Artefacts
 VITA, acronym for Virginia Information Technologies Agency
 VITA, the IRS Volunteer Income Tax Assistance Program
 VITA, VMEbus International Trade Association
 Beta (letter) a.k.a. Vita (β), the second letter of the Greek alphabet
 Vita: Life in a Zone of Social Abandonment, an ethnographic study by João Biehl
Vita (given name), the name.

People

Given name
Vita (rapper) (born 1976), stage name of American rapper
Vita Anda Tērauda (born 1962), Latvian politician
Vita Buivid (born 1962), Russian contemporary artist
Vita Chambers (born 1993),  Barbadian-Canadian singer and songwriter
Vita Gollancz (1926 – 2009), British painter
Vita Heine (born 1984), Norwegian racing cyclist
Vita Kin (born 1969), Ukrainian fashion designer
Vita Kuktienė (born 1980), Lithuanian basketball player
Vita Marissa (born 1981), retired badminton player from Indonesia
Vita Matīse (born 1972), Latvian windsurfer
Vita Mavrič, Slovene singer
Vita Nel (born 1975), South African beach volleyballer 
Vita Nikolaenko (born 1995), Belarusian footballer
Vita Sackville-West (1892–1962), English author and poet
Vita Sidorkina (born 1994), Russian model
Vita Silchenko (born 1967), Belarusian fencer
Vita Zubchenko (born 1989), Ukrainian rhythmic gymnast

Surname
Alessio Vita (born 1993), Italian footballer
Carol Vita, American politician
Claudine Vita (born 1996), German athlete
Lucas Vita (born 1985), Brazilian water polo player

Fictional characters
Vita (Nanoha), fictional character in the Magical Girl Lyrical Nanoha series

Places
 Vita, Ávila, in the province of Ávila, Castile and León, Spain
 Vita, Maharashtra, a small town in the state of Maharashtra in India
 Vita, Manitoba, a small town in southeastern Manitoba, Canada
 Vita, Sicily, a city on Sicily in the province of Trapani, Italy
 Viţa, a village in Nușeni Commune, Bistriţa-Năsăud County, Romania

Latvian feminine given names

el:Ζωή (αποσαφήνιση)